During the American Revolutionary War, the Georgia State Navy consisted of only a few ships, most of which were destroyed in 1778 and 1779.

History
 
Georgia was one of the first of the Thirteen Colonies to engage a ship for its own naval purposes. In June 1775, not long after the American Revolutionary War broke out, it commissioned an armed sloop for the purpose of seizing a British transport carrying munitions that was destined for the Georgia port of Savannah. Funds were authorized in 1776 for expeditions by Captains Oliver Bowen and Job Pray to acquire and arm ships in the West Indies; whether these were actually successful is unknown. In November 1776 the state established an admiralty court for adjudicating the distribution of prizes captured at sea.

The state also authorized the construction of row galleys in 1776. A total of four were put into service: Washington, Lee, Bulloch, and Congress. The galleys' crews came from slaves seized when the Patriots confiscated Royalist Governor James Wright's estate. In addition, troops from the Georgia State Militia went on board the galleys to serve as marines.

The galleys were unsuited for use on the high seas, but with their shallow drafts and oars were well-suited to serve along the state's coast and on its rivers. They carried troops and supplies for the two unsuccessful invasions of East Florida in 1777 and 1778. During these operations the galleys also secured river crossings, escorted vessels transporting troops, and protected the army's flank. 

The galleys' greatest success was the Frederica naval action on 19 April 1778. Washington, Lee, Bulloch, and some boats captured the 12-gun sloop HMS Hinchinbrook and the Loyalist privateer Rebeccas off St. Simons Island, after the British vessels had grounded and their crews had escaped ashore.  The Georgia State galleys took their prizes to Sunbury.

The four galleys served during the 1779 Siege of Savannah, a failed Franco-American attempt to retake the city from the British. The continued British occupation of the state (the only state in which the royal governor returned to take control), made the construction of further ships impossible.

In the late 20th century, it became a popular practice for the Governor of Georgia to award a certificate to new members of the Georgia General Assembly (and others) bestowing upon them the honorary title of Admiral of the Georgia Navy.

See also
Georgia Naval Militia

Citations

References
Crawford, Michael J., Dennis M. Conrad, E. Gordon Bowen-Hassell, & Mark L. Hayes, eds. (2013) Naval Documents of the American Revolution. Vol. 12. (Washington, DC:  Naval History & Heritage Command, Department of the Navy).
  (This work contains summary information on each of the various state navies.)
 

Navy
Military units and formations of the United States in the American Revolutionary War
Navy
Military units and formations established in 1775
Disbanded navies